The 1973–74 Regionalliga  was the eleventh season of the Regionalliga, the second tier of the German football league system. The league operated in five regional divisions, Berlin, North, South, Southwest and West. The five league champions and runners-up then entered a promotion play-off to determine the two clubs to move up to the Bundesliga for the next season. Northern German and Berlin champions Eintracht Braunschweig and Tennis Borussia Berlin were promoted.

It was the last season of the Regionalliga as a tier two league, being replaced by two regional divisions of the 2. Bundesliga at this level from 1974–75. Apart from the two teams promoted to the Bundesliga, 38 clubs qualified for the new 2. Bundesliga while the remaining 43 dropped down to the third division Verbandsligas, Amateurligas and Oberligas. Qualification for the 2. Bundesliga took the previous five Regionalliga season into account to determine the qualified teams, rather than just the final tables of 1973–74.

Regionalliga Nord
The 1973–74 season saw three new clubs in the league, Concordia Hamburg and VfL Pinneberg, both promoted from the Amateurliga, while Eintracht Braunschweig been relegated from the Bundesliga to the league.

Regionalliga Berlin
The 1973–74 season saw two new clubs in the league, SC Westend 01 and BBC Südost, both promoted from the Amateurliga, while no club had been relegated from the Bundesliga to the league.

Regionalliga West
The 1973–74 season saw four new clubs in the league, Rot-Weiß Lüdenscheid, Viktoria Köln and OSC Solingen, all three promoted from the Amateurliga, while Rot-Weiß Oberhausen been relegated from the Bundesliga to the league.

Regionalliga Südwest
The 1973–74 season saw two new clubs in the league, Eintracht Kreuznach and FC Ensdorf, both promoted from the Amateurliga, while no club had been relegated from the Bundesliga to the league.

Regionalliga Süd
The 1973–74 season saw three new clubs in the league, FC Augsburg, VfR Mannheim and FSV Frankfurt, all three promoted from the Amateurliga, while no club had been relegated from the Bundesliga to the league.

Bundesliga promotion round

Group 1

Group 2

References

Sources
 30 Jahre Bundesliga  30th anniversary special, publisher: kicker Sportmagazin, published: 1993
 kicker-Almanach 1990  Yearbook of German football, publisher: kicker Sportmagazin, published: 1989, 
 DSFS Liga-Chronik seit 1945  publisher: DSFS, published: 2005

External links
Regionalliga on the official DFB website 
kicker 
Das Deutsche Fussball Archiv  Historic German league tables

1973-74
2
Ger